Valentin Sergeyevich Okorochkov (born March 19, 1980, in Oryol) is a Russian professional football coach and a former player. Currently, he works as an assistant manager for FC Oryol. He made his debut in the Russian Premier League in 2007 for FC Kuban Krasnodar.

Honours
 Russian Second Division, Zone South best midfielder: 2010.

References

1980 births
Sportspeople from Oryol
Living people
Russian footballers
FC Kuban Krasnodar players
FC Salyut Belgorod players
FC Fakel Voronezh players
FC Chernomorets Novorossiysk players
FC Baltika Kaliningrad players
Russian Premier League players
Russian football managers
Association football midfielders
FC Avangard Kursk players
FC Oryol players